Perla Cristina Morones Monjaras (born 4 March 1991) is a Mexican professional footballer who plays for Guatemalan team C.D. Suchitepéquez.

Career
In 2019, Morones joined Chilean club Colo-Colo.

References

External links 
 

1991 births
Living people
Women's association football forwards
Mexican women's footballers
Footballers from Guanajuato
Liga MX Femenil players
Club León (women) footballers
Mexican expatriate women's footballers
Mexican expatriate sportspeople in Chile
Mexican expatriate sportspeople in Guatemala
Expatriate women's footballers in Chile
20th-century Mexican women
21st-century Mexican women
Mexican footballers